Realf Zhivanaj (born 15 March 1998) is an Albanian footballer who currently plays as a center back for Dinamo Tirana in the Kategoria e Parë.

Club career
After spending 10 years at the Tirana Academy, Zhivanaj had a season in American college soccer with the Montana State Billings Yellowjackets, scoring 4 goals in 16 games. He then also had a few months with the St. Francis Brooklyn Terriers before returning to Albania in 2019.

Honours

Club 
Tirana
Kategoria Superiore (1) : 2021–22
Albanian Supercup (2) :2017 ,2022

References

External links
 Profile - FSHF
 Profile - MSUB

1998 births
Living people
Footballers from Tirana
Albanian footballers
Association football central defenders
KF Tirana players
St. Francis Brooklyn Terriers men's soccer players
FK Vora players
KF Tërbuni Pukë players
Kategoria Superiore players
Albanian expatriate footballers
Expatriate soccer players in the United States
Albanian expatriate sportspeople in the United States